Ski jumping at the 2017 Winter Universiade was held in Sunkar International Ski Jumping Complex from 1 to 5 February 2017.

Men's events

Women's events

Mixed events

Medal table

References

External links
Ski jumping results at the 2017 Winter Universiade.
Results book

 
Ski jumping
2017
2017 in ski jumping